Aerowisata is an Indonesian hospitality company based in Jakarta. It has five main businesses, consisting of Foodservice, Hotels, Travel, Transportation and Logistics. It is a subsidiary of Garuda Indonesia Group.

History 

On February 7, 1974, Garuda Indonesia handed the management of PT Satriavi Tours and travel to Aerowisata. The next company that later changed its name to PT Biro Perjalanan Satriavi became first subsidiary Aerowisata.

On July 29, 1974, Aerowisata began operating the Hotel Sanur Beach in Bali as the first hotel of Aerowisata.

December 23, 1974, Aerowisata start catering business in Garuda Indonesia flight to serve under the flag of PT Garuda Dairy Farm Aero Catering Service. Since 1991, the company located at the terminal end of the Soekarno-Hatta International Airport was renamed Aerowisata Catering Service (ACS).

After forming Garuda Orient Holidays (GOH) in Australia in 1981 and PT Aero Service Perkasa in 1987, founded the PT Mandira Erajasa Aerowisata spacecraft in July 1988. Marked the establishment of business expansion into the realm of transportation Aerowisata. In 1991, holdings included the Sengiggi Beach hotel which includes the Nusa Dua and the Nusa Indah, as well as Sanur Beach.

As of the end of December 2009,  Aerowisata has eleven subsidiaries and eight affiliated companies.

Hotels & Resorts 
Aerowisata currently owns 4 hotels located in 4 different provinces in Indonesia with 3 different hotel star level. Those are:
 Five stars: Prama from Sanskrit language means Excellence
 Four stars: Kila from Javanese language means Sparkle
 Three stars: Asana, an acronym of the Indonesian words Akrab, Santun and Mempesona means Friendly, Polite and Charming

References

External links

Companies based in Jakarta
Hospitality companies established in 1973
Foodservice companies
Garuda Indonesia
Hospitality companies of Indonesia
Hotel chains in Indonesia
Indonesian brands
Food and drink companies of Indonesia
Indonesian companies established in 1973